Mathias Surmann (born 19 December 1974) is a German former professional footballer who played as a midfielder.

Career
Surmann was born in Thuine. made his debut on the professional league level in the 2. Bundesliga for SV Meppen on 1 August 1997 when he came on as a substitute in the 79th minute in a game against Fortuna Köln.

References

1974 births
Living people
German footballers
Association football midfielders
2. Bundesliga players
SV Meppen players
SpVgg Greuther Fürth players
VfL Osnabrück players